This is the discography of Rampage, an American rapper.

Discography

Studio albums

Collaborative albums

Unreleased albums
 The Red Oktoba (1994)

Extended plays
 R.E.A.L - Road to Everyone Ain't Loyal (2012)

Mixtapes
 Demagraffix: Pre-Album Mixtape (2006)
 Da Ambush, Vol. 1 (2008)
 Remington Steele (2011)
 Remington Steele - Vibes & Culture (2014)

Singles

As lead artist

As featured artist

Promotional singles

Guest appearances

References

Discographies of American artists
Hip hop discographies